Axel Fabrice Konan (born 20 July 1997) is an Ivorian professional footballer. In 2019, he played for Kohtla-Järve JK Järve.

References

External links 
 
 

1997 births
Living people
Ivorian footballers
Association football defenders
Ivorian expatriate footballers
Expatriate footballers in Moldova
Expatriate footballers in Belarus
Expatriate footballers in Estonia
Moossou FC players
FC Saxan players
FC Gomel players
Ida-Virumaa FC Alliance players
Esiliiga players
Ivorian expatriate sportspeople in Belarus
Ivorian expatriate sportspeople in Estonia
Ivorian expatriate sportspeople in Moldova